Project One is a DJ and production supergroup consisting of two hardstyle artists, Willem Rebergen (Headhunterz) and Joram Metekohy (Wildstylez). So far, the act has released an album, an EP, and several singles.

"Headhunterz and Wildstylez Present: Project One" was made over the course of three months in a Dutch record studio, finishing approximately one track each week. Album samplers were released afterwards, featuring the full versions of each album track, and a remix release, were released under Scantraxx Reloaded.

Discography

Albums 
 2008: 
The album (Scantraxx Reloaded)

EP'S 
 2017: 
EP I (Q-Dance Records)

Singles

Remixes EP

References

Dutch electronic music groups
Hardstyle musicians
DJ duos
Electronic dance music duos
Male musical duos